Halyomorpha is a genus of shield bugs in the subfamily Pentatominae and tribe Cappaeini.

Species
Species within this genus include: 

Halyomorpha angusticeps Bergroth, 1914 
Halyomorpha angustisecta Linnavuori, 1982 
Halyomorpha annulicornis (Signoret, 1858) 
Halyomorpha azhari Ahmad & Zaidi, 1989 
Halyomorpha bimaculata Bergroth, 1892 
Halyomorpha canalana Distant, 1914 
Halyomorpha capneri Leston, 1952 
Halyomorpha carmona Linnavuori, 1982 
Halyomorpha distanti Jeannel, 1913 
Halyomorpha fletcheri Distant, 1918 
Halyomorpha guttula (Ellenrieder, 1862) 
Halyomorpha halys (Stål, 1855) – brown marmorated stink bug
Halyomorpha hasani Rider & Rolston, 1995 
Halyomorpha illuminata Distant, 1911 
Halyomorpha javanica Hasan, 1993 
Halyomorpha lata Breddin, 1899 
Halyomorpha leopoldi Schouteden, 1903 
Halyomorpha longiceps Breddin, 1900 
Halyomorpha malleata (Distant, 1890) 
Halyomorpha mayumbeensis Villiers, 1967 
Halyomorpha murrea Distant, 1887 
Halyomorpha ornativentris Breddin, 1900 
Halyomorpha philippina Black, 1968 
Halyomorpha picoides Linnavuori, 1975 
Halyomorpha picticornis Bergroth, 1915 
Halyomorpha picus (Fabricius, 1794) 
Halyomorpha punctata Cachan, 1952 
Halyomorpha punjabensis Ahmad & Kamaluddin, 1977 
Halyomorpha reflexa (Signoret, 1858) 
Halyomorpha rugosa Schouteden, 1913 
Halyomorpha schoutedeni Bergroth, 1913 
Halyomorpha scutellata Distant, 1879 
Halyomorpha seyidiensis Jeannel, 1913 
Halyomorpha sinuata Hasan, 1993 
Halyomorpha viridescens (Walker, 1867) 
Halyomorpha viridinigra Breddin, 1901 
Halyomorpha yasumatsui Abbasi & Ahmad, 1974

References

Pentatomidae
Pentatomidae genera
Taxa named by Gustav Mayr